Glacier Lake may refer to:

 Glacier Lake (Alberta)
 Glacier Lake (Custer County, Idaho)
 Glacier Lake (Elmore County, Idaho)
 Glacier Lake (Onondaga County, New York)
 Glacier Lake School, a school in Lake County, Montana

See also
 Glaciar Lake, a lake in Bolivia
 Glazier Lake, a lake on the border between Maine and New Brunswick